São Roque (Portuguese for Saint Roch) may refer to:

Places

Brazil
 Cape São Roque, a headland in Rio Grande do Norte state.
 São Roque, São Paulo, a municipality in São Paulo state
 São Roque de Minas, a municipality in Minas Gerais state
 São Roque do Canaã, Espírito Santo, a municipality in Espírito Santo state
 Boa Ventura de São Roque, a municipality in the state of Paraná in the Southern Region of Brazil

Portugal
 São Roque, a parish in the municipality of Oliveira de Azeméis

Azores
 São Roque, Ponta Delgada, a parish in the district of Ponta Delgada, São Miguel Island 
 São Roque do Pico, a municipality along the northern coast of Pico
 São Roque do Pico (parish), a civil parish in the municipality of São Roque do Pico

Madeira
 São Roque (Funchal), a civil parish in the municipality of Funchal 
 São Roque do Faial, a civil parish in Santana, Madeira Islands

Other uses
 Church of São Roque or Igreja de São Roque, a Jesuit church in Lisbon, Portugal

See also
 Roque (disambiguation)
 San Roque (disambiguation)
 Saint Roch